
Walton House may refer to:

Canada
 Murray-Walton House and Farm, Haldimand, Ontario, a registered historic place in Southwestern Ontario

United Kingdom
 Walton House, also known as Mill House and The Wharf, Sutton Courtenay, Oxford, a Grade II listed house
 Walton House, the earliest building of Somerville College, Oxford
 Walton House and Attached Walls, Stone, Stafford, a Grade II* listed building in the Borough of Stafford

United States
(by state, then city/town)

 Dr. James Wyatt Walton House, Benton, Arkansas, listed on the National Register of Historic Places (NRHP)
 Dr. Robert and Mary Walton House, Modesto, California, listed on the NRHP in Stanislaus County, California
 George Walton House, Augusta, Georgia, a National Historic Landmark
 James A. Walton House, Columbus, Georgia, formerly listed on the NRHP in Muscogee County, Georgia
 John J. Walton House, Belleview, Kentucky, listed on the NRHP in Boone County, Kentucky
 Walton-Howry House, Sardis, Mississippi, listed on the NRHP in Panola County, Mississippi
 Asa Walton House, East Fallowfield Township, Pennsylvania, NRHP-listed
 Walton House (Pittsburgh), Pittsburgh, Pennsylvania
 Dr. Martin Walton House, Springfield, Tennessee, listed on the NRHP in Robertson County, Tennessee
 Walton-Wiggins Farm, Springfield, Tennessee, listed on the NRHP in Robertson County, Tennessee
 Franklin and Amelia Walton House, Centerville, Utah, NRHP-listed
 Wesley and Frances Walton House, Murray, Utah, listed on the NRHP in Salt Lake County, Utah

In fiction
 The family house in The Waltons television series

See also
 Walton Hall (disambiguation)

Architectural disambiguation pages